The Preston England Temple is the 52nd operating temple of the Church of Jesus Christ of Latter-day Saints (LDS Church).

The temple serves Latter-day Saints from the Midlands and northern parts of England, the whole of Scotland, the Isle of Man, the Belfast Stake in Northern Ireland and the Dublin Stake in the Republic of Ireland. The Limerick District in the Republic of Ireland is served by the London England Temple.

History
The LDS Church took root in Preston when its first missionaries arrived in 1837. The Preston Ward is the longest continuously functioning unit in the LDS Church in the world. In June 1990, Jeffrey R. Holland was appointed as area president, and Gordon B. Hinckley, then serving as a counselor in the First Presidency, assigned him to seek a possible temple site in northern England.

A site on the north edge of Chorley in Lancashire, a few miles from the city of Preston, was selected, in part, because it "overlooked rolling hills to the east and a greenbelt area to the north and had easy access to the regional highway system".

Due to its place in LDS Church history and the growth of membership in Preston, Hinckley announced the area would be the site for Britain's second temple (the first is in Surrey, near London). The temple groundbreaking ceremony was on 12 June 1994, with Hinckley presiding. When construction was completed, a two-week public open house in May 1998 attracted 123,000 visitors, and members from 24 stakes volunteered.

The new temple was dedicated in 15 sessions from June 7–10, 1998, and more than 18,000 Latter-day Saints participated. The dedicatory prayer offered by Hinckley, who was then serving as the church's president, included these words, "Bless the Saints of the United Kingdom, these wonderful people of England, Scotland, Wales, and Northern Ireland, as well as those of the Irish Republic. As they pay their tithes and offerings, wilt Thou open the windows of heaven and shower down blessings upon them."

In 2014, the European Court of Human Rights affirmed a 2008 judgement by the House of Lords who had ruled that the temple was not qualified as a "place of public religious worship" since access was restricted to this select group (church members holding a temple recommend) and this determined the LDS Church tax status.

Site and architecture

It is the centrepiece of a 15-acre (6 hectare) complex that includes a stake centre, a missionary training centre, a family history facility, a distribution centre, temple patron housing, temple missionary accommodations, and a grounds building. The temple itself has a modern, single spire design and an exterior finish of Olympia white granite from Sardinia.

The white granite exterior and zinc roof have caused it to be described as reminiscent of England's old churches. The angel Moroni statue atop the spire is known as, "one of the landmarks of the M61". The temple has four ordinance rooms and four sealing rooms, and is the largest Latter-day Saint temple in Europe, at 69,630 square feet (6,470 m2). The older London England Temple is smaller, at 46,174 square feet (4,290 m2).

Pageant
In the summer of 2013, the church staged a pageant on the grounds of the temple, similar to the Hill Cumorah Pageant and others done in the United States, but with a very British theme. Titled "Truth Will Prevail," it was the first official church pageant performed outside of North America. The pageant script was written by Alex Mackenzie-Johns, a British Latter-day Saint, and was under the guidance of Stephen C. Kerr, a British area seventy.

The event had ticketed attendance, with seating of 1,500 per night at the "Pageant Theatre marquee". Approximately 15,000 tickets were distributed, free of charge, for the 10 day run. The pageant included 33 core cast members, 300 families cast, and a 150 voice choir.

See also

 List of temples of The Church of Jesus Christ of Latter-day Saints
 List of temples of The Church of Jesus Christ of Latter-day Saints by geographic region
 The Church of Jesus Christ of Latter-day Saints in England
 The Church of Jesus Christ of Latter-day Saints in Ireland
 The Church of Jesus Christ of Latter-day Saints in Scotland
 The Church of Jesus Christ of Latter-day Saints in the Isle of Man
 The Church of Jesus Christ of Latter-day Saints in the United Kingdom

References

External links
 
 Preston England Temple Official site
 Preston England Temple at ChurchofJesusChristTemples.org

20th-century Latter Day Saint temples
Buildings and structures in Chorley
Religion in Lancashire
Religious buildings and structures completed in 1998
Temples in England
The Church of Jesus Christ of Latter-day Saints in England
The Church of Jesus Christ of Latter-day Saints in the United Kingdom
1998 establishments in England
Religious buildings and structures in Lancashire